Portulaca quadrifida, known as pusley, wild purslane, chicken weed (or chickenweed), singleflowered purslane, smallleaved purslane and 10 o'clock plant, is a species of flowering plant in the genus Portulaca, possibly native to Africa, but certainly widespread over the Old World Tropics, and introduced elsewhere. It is collected in the wild and eaten in salads or cooked, and is a favorite fodder for chickens and pigs.

References
 

 

quadrifida
Taxa named by Carl Linnaeus
Plants described in 1767